David García Cubillo (born 6 January 1978 in Madrid) is a Spanish retired footballer who played as a midfielder, and is a current manager.

Managerial statistics

References

External links

1978 births
Living people
Footballers from Madrid
Spanish footballers
Association football midfielders
La Liga players
Segunda División players
Segunda División B players
Tercera División players
Atlético Madrid B players
Atlético Madrid footballers
Xerez CD footballers
Recreativo de Huelva players
Getafe CF footballers
Rayo Vallecano players
CF Fuenlabrada footballers
UB Conquense footballers
Spanish football managers
Segunda División B managers
Marbella FC managers
Hércules CF managers